Triplophysa laticeps is a species of stone loach endemic to Yunnan, China.

It can grow to  total length. The type locality is a small stream with a moderate to swift current and gravel substrate.

References

L
Freshwater fish of China
Endemic fauna of Yunnan
Fish described in 1997
Taxa named by Zhou Wei (zoologist)
Taxa named by Cui Gui-Hua